The Agama Islam Society is a consultative council of Islamic scholars that are based in  Marawi, Philippines. The basis in instituting the society is to act as an assembly in the establishment of Islamic faith in 1956. The society was organized and led by late Sheikh Ahmad Bashir in 1955. Its governing body consists of fifteen members called Shura Council which is based on shura.

The society has helped established various madrasahs, and the notable one is Jamiatu Muslim Mindanao. In 2004, these madrasahs were mainstreamed in 16 regions nationwide mainly in Muslim areas in Mindanao, under the auspices and program of the Department of Education.

See also
 Islam in the Philippines

References

External links
Official Website

Religious organizations based in the Philippines
Islamic organizations based in the Philippines
Marawi
Islamic organizations established in 1956